The 2012 Linafoot season, the top division of the Congolese Association Football Federation, was the 51st edition since its establishment. It began on 12 February 2012 and ended on 20 November 2012. During the mid-season break it was decided the second half of the season would consist of 10 rounds of matches only; 3 entire rounds were cancelled.

Clubs
A total of 14 teams are contesting the league, played under a round-robbin format.

League table

CS Don Bosco also qualified for the 2013 CAF Confederation Cup as the 2012 Coupe du Congo winner.

References

Linafoot seasons
football
Congo
Congo